Cabo is Spanish, Portuguese and Galician for cape.  It may refer to:

 Cabo San Lucas, a resort city in Baja California Sur, Mexico
 Cabó, a municipality in Alt Urgell, Lleida, Catalonia, Spain

Other places

 Cabo Blanco, Costa Rica
 Cabo Corrientes (municipality), a municipality in Jalisco, Mexico
 Cabo Delgado, a province of Mozambique
 Cabo Frio, a Brazilian municipality 
 Cabo Orange National Park, Amapá, Brazil
 Cabo Polonio, a hamlet in the Rocha Department, Uruguay
 Cabo Rojo, Puerto Rico, a municipality situated on the southwest coast of Puerto Rico
 Cabo Verde, the Portuguese name for Cape Verde
 San José del Cabo, a city in Baja California Sur, Mexico, part of Los Cabos with Cabo San Lucas

Capes:
 Cabo Branco Lighthouse, a cape in the extreme est of the entire Americas. Joao Pessoa, Brazil
 Cabo Catoche, the northernmost point on the Yucatán Peninsula
 Cabo Corrientes, Chocó, a cape on the Pacific coast of Colombia
 Cabo Corrientes, Cuba, a cape in the extreme west of Cuba
 Cabo Corrientes, Jalisco, a cape in Jalisco, Mexico
 Cabo Corrientes, Mar del Plata, a cape in Argentina
 Cabo da Roca and the Cabo da Roca Lighthouse, Portugal
 Cabo de São Vicente, a headland in the Algarve, Portugal
 Cape Delgado, a cape on the border of Mozambique and Tanzania
 Cabo Girão, a cliff on Madeira, Portugal
 Cabo Meredith, the Spanish name for Cape Meredith, Falkland Islands
 Cabo de Santo Agostinho, city in Pernambuco, Brazil

Other

 Cabo (card game)
 Cabo, a song by Ricky Montgomery
 Cabo Wabo, a nightclub
 Cabo Yachts

The acronym CABO may refer to
 Council of American Building Officials

See also 
 Cabo Blanco (disambiguation)
 Cabo Rojo (disambiguation)
 Gabo (disambiguation)